The F.A. Benham House, also known as the Stoner House and the Barquist House, is a historic building located in Des Moines, Iowa, United States.  Built in 1884, the two-story structure features wood-frame construction, a brick foundation, and decorative details that were influenced by the Stick Style of architecture.  Its significance is found in its late Victorian design that is exemplified in the Eastlake style.  It can be seen in the building's massing, roof's steep pitch, and front porch's spindlework.  The house was listed on the National Register of Historic Places in 1998.  The house shares the historic designation with the frame barn (c. 1900) and the Victorian cast iron fence and gate that runs in front of the house.

References

Houses completed in 1884
Stick-Eastlake architecture in Iowa
Houses in Des Moines, Iowa
National Register of Historic Places in Des Moines, Iowa
Houses on the National Register of Historic Places in Iowa
1884 establishments in Iowa